This article presents the heads of the military departments of the Russian Empire.

College of War

The Russian College of War (or War Collegium) was created in the course of Government reform of Peter the Great 11 December 1717.

Presidents
 Prince Alexander Menshikov 1717–24
 Prince Anikita Repnin 1724–26
 Prince Mikhail Golitsyn 1728–30
 Prince Vasiliy Dolgorukov 1730–31
 Count Burkhard Christoph von Münnich 1732–41
 Prince Nikita Trubetskoy 1760–63
 Count Zakhar Chernyshev 1763–74
 Prince Grigory Potemkin 1774–91
 Count Nikolai Saltykov 1791–1802

Vice-Presidents

Ministry of Land Forces

Collegiums were replaced by Ministries as part of the Government reform of Alexander I.

 Count Sergey Vyazmitinov 8 September 1802 – 13 January 1808
 Count Aleksey Arakcheyev 13 January 1808 – 1 January 1810
 Prince Michael Andreas Barclay de Tolly 20 January 1810 – 24 August 1812
 Prince Aleksey Gorchakov 24 August 1812 – 12 December 1815 acting

Ministry of War

On 17 December 1815 the Ministry of Land Forces was renamed to the Ministry of War.

 Count Pyotr Konovnitsyn 12 December 1815 – 6 May 1819
 Baron Pyotr Meller-Zakomelskiy 6 May 1819 – 14 March 1823
 Count Aleksander Tatischev 14 March 1823 – 26 August 1827
 Prince Alexander Chernyshyov 26 August 1827 – 26 August 1852
 Prince Vasily Dolgorukov 26 August 1852 – 17 April 1856
 Nikolai Sukhozanet 17 April 1856 – 16 May 1861
 Count Dmitry Milyutin 16 May 1861 – 21 May 1881
 Pyotr Vannovsky 22 May 1881 – 1 January 1898
 Aleksey Kuropatkin 1 January 1898 – 7 February 1904
 Viktor Sakharov 11 March 1904 – 21 June 1905
 Aleksandr Roediger 21 June 1905 – 11 March 1909
 Vladimir Sukhomlinov 11 March 1909 – 13 June 1915
 Alexei Polivanov 13 June 1915 – 15 March 1916
 Dmitry Shuvayev 15 March 1916 – 3 January 1917
 Mikhail Belyaev 3 January 1917 – 28 February 1917
 Alexander Guchkov 1 March 1917 – 30 April 1917

Ministry of Sea Forces

 Count Nikolay Mordvinov 8 September 1802 – 28 December 1802
 Pavel Chichagov 31 December 1802 – 28 November 1811
 Ivan de Traverse 28 November 1811 – 17 December 1815

Ministry of the Navy

On 17 December 1815 the Ministry of Sea Forces was renamed, becoming the Ministry of the Navy.

 Ivan de Traverse 17 December 1815 – 24 March 1828
 Anton Moller 24 March 1828 – 5 February 1836
 Prince Alexander Menshikov 5 February 1836 – 23 February 1855
 Baron Ferdinand von Wrangel 18 May 1855 – 27 July 1857
 Nikolay Metlin 27 July 1857 – 18 September 1860
 Nikolay Karlovich Krabbe 19 September 1860 – 3 January 1876
 Stepan Lesovskiy 12 January 1876 – 23 June 1880
 Aleksey Peschurov 23 June 1880 – 11 January 1882
 Ivan Shestakov 11 January 1882 – 21 November 1888
 Nikolay Chikhachyov 28 November 1888 – 13 July 1896
 Pyotr Tyrtov 13 July 1896 – 4 March 1903
 Theodor Avellan 10 March 1903 – 29 June 1905
 Aleksei Birilev 29 June 1905 – 11 January 1907
 Ivan Dikov 11 January 1907 – 8 January 1909
 Stepan Voevodskiy 8 January 1909 – 18 March 1911
 Ivan Grigorovich 19 March 1911 – 28 February 1917
 Alexander Guchkov 1 March 1917 – 30 April 1917

See also
 List of heads of the military of post-imperial Russia
 Military history of the Russian Empire
 Council of Ministers of Russia
 Russian Provisional Government

External links
  Ministers of Imperial Russia

Military ministers

Naval ministers